Charles-Maurice de Talleyrand-Périgord (2 February 1754 – 17 May 1838), 1st Prince of Benevento, then Prince of Talleyrand, was a French clergyman, politician and leading diplomat. After studying theology, he became Agent-General of the Clergy in 1780. In 1789, just before the French Revolution, he became  Bishop of Autun.  He worked at the highest levels of successive French governments, most commonly as foreign minister or in some other diplomatic capacity. His career spanned the regimes of Louis XVI, the years of the French Revolution, Napoleon, Louis XVIII, and Louis-Philippe. Those Talleyrand served often distrusted him but, like Napoleon, found him extremely useful. The name "Talleyrand" has become a byword for crafty, cynical diplomacy.

He was Napoleon's chief diplomat during the years when French military victories brought one European state after another under French hegemony. However, most of the time, Talleyrand worked for peace so as to consolidate France's gains.  He succeeded in obtaining peace with Austria through the 1801 Treaty of Lunéville and with Britain in the 1802 Treaty of Amiens. He could not prevent the renewal of war in 1803 but by 1805 he opposed his emperor's renewed wars against Austria, Prussia, and Russia. He resigned as foreign minister in August 1807, but retained the trust of Napoleon. He conspired to undermine the emperor's plans through secret dealings with Tsar Alexander of Russia and Austrian minister Metternich. Talleyrand sought a negotiated secure peace so as to perpetuate the gains of the French Revolution. Napoleon rejected peace and, when he fell in 1814, Talleyrand supported the Bourbon Restoration decided by the Allies. He played a major role at the Congress of Vienna in 1814–1815, where he negotiated a favourable settlement for France and played a role in unwinding the wars of Napoleon.

Talleyrand polarizes scholarly opinion. Some regard him as one of the most versatile, skilled and influential diplomats in European history, and some believe that he was a traitor, betraying in turn the Ancien Régime, the French Revolution, Napoleon, and the Restoration.

Early life
Talleyrand was born in Paris into an aristocratic family which, though ancient and illustrious, was not particularly prosperous. His father, Count Charles Daniel de Talleyrand-Périgord, was 20 years of age when Charles was born. His mother was Alexandrine de Damas d'Antigny. Both his parents held positions at court, but as the youngest children of their respective families, had no important income. Talleyrand's father had a long career in the Army, reaching the rank of lieutenant general, as did his uncle, Gabriel Marie de Périgord, despite having the same infirmity from which Talleyrand would suffer throughout his life.

From childhood, Talleyrand walked with a limp, which  caused him to later be called  (French for "the lame devil") among other nicknames. In his Memoirs, he linked this infirmity to an accident at age four, but recent research has shown that his limp was in fact congenital. In any case, his handicap made him unable to follow his father into a military career, leaving the obvious career of the Church.

The latter held out the hope for Charles-Maurice of succeeding his uncle, Alexandre Angélique de Talleyrand-Périgord, then Archbishop of Reims, one of the  most prestigious and richest dioceses in France.  At eight years old, Talleyrand attended the Collège d'Harcourt, the seminary of Saint-Sulpice, while studying theology at the Sorbonne until the age of 21. In his free time he read the works of Montesquieu, Voltaire, and other writers who were beginning to question the authority of the Ancien Régime in matters of church and state. As subdeacon he witnessed the coronation of Louis XVI at Reims in 1775.

He was not ordained a priest until four years later, on 19 December 1779, at the age of 25. Very soon, in 1780, he attained the influential position of Agent-General of the Clergy, and was instrumental in promoting the drawing up of a general inventory of Church properties in France as of 1785, along with a defence of "inalienable rights of the Church", the latter being a stance he would later deny. In 1788, the influence of Talleyrand's father and family overcame the King's dislike and obtained his appointment as Bishop of Autun, with a stipend of 22,000 livres. He was consecrated a bishop on 4 January 1789 by Louis-André de Grimaldi. The undoubtedly able Talleyrand, though hardly devout and even free-thinking in the Enlightenment mould, was outwardly respectful of religious observance. In the course of the Revolution, however, he was to manifest his cynicism and abandon all orthodox Catholic practice. He resigned his bishopric on 13 April 1791. On 29 June 1802, Pope Pius VII laicized Talleyrand, an event most uncommon at the time in the history of the Church.

French Revolution
Shortly after he was consecrated as Bishop of Autun, Talleyrand attended the Estates-General of 1789, representing the clergy, the First Estate. During the French Revolution, Talleyrand strongly supported the anti-clericalism of the revolutionaries. Along with Mirabeau, he promoted the appropriation of Church properties. He participated in the writing of the Declaration of the Rights of Man and of the Citizen and proposed the Civil Constitution of the Clergy that nationalised the Church in preference to allegiance to the Pope, and swore in the first four constitutional bishops, even though he had himself resigned as Bishop following his excommunication by Pope Pius VI in 1791. During the Fête de la Fédération on 14 July 1790, Talleyrand celebrated Mass. Notably, he promoted public education in full spirit of the Enlightenment by preparing a 216-page Report on Public Instruction. It proposed pyramidical structure rising through local, district, and departmental schools, and parts were later adopted. During his 5 month tenure in the Estates-General, Talleyrand was also involved in drawing up the police regulations of Paris, proposed the suffrage of Jews, supported a ban on the tithes and invented a method to ensure loans. Few bishops followed him in obedience to the new decree, and much of the French clergy came to view him as schismatic.

Just before his resignation from the bishopric, Talleyrand had been elected, with Mirabeau and the Abbé Sieyès, a member of the department of Paris. In that capacity he did useful work for some eighteen months in seeking to support the cause of order in the turbulent capital. Though he was often on strained terms with Mirabeau, his views generally coincided with those of that statesman, who before he died is said to have advised Talleyrand to develop a close understanding with England.

In 1792, he was sent twice, unofficially, to London to avert war, and he was cordially received by Pitt and Grenville. After his first visit, he persuaded the then foreign minister, Charles François Dumouriez, of the importance of having a fully accredited ambassador in London, and the marquis de Chauvelin was duly appointed, with Talleyrand as his deputy. Still, after an initial British declaration of neutrality during the first campaigns of 1792, his mission ultimately failed. In September 1792, he left Paris for England just at the beginning of the September massacres. The National Convention issued a warrant for his arrest in December 1792. In March 1794, with the two countries at the brink of war, he was forced to leave Britain by Pitt's expulsion order. He then went to the neutral country of the United States where he stayed until his return to France in 1796. During his stay, he supported himself by working as a bank agent, involved in commodity trading and real estate speculation. He was a house guest of Aaron Burr of New York and collaborated with Theophile Cazenove in Philadelphia. Burr would later seek similar refuge in Talleyrand's home during his self-imposed European exile (1808–12); however, Talleyrand would refuse to return the favor, Burr having killed Talleyrand's friend Alexander Hamilton in an 1804 duel.

After 9 Thermidor, he mobilised his friends (most notably the abbé Martial Borye Desrenaudes and Germaine de Staël) to lobby in the National Convention and the newly established Directoire for his return. His name was suppressed from the émigré list and he returned to France on 25 September 1796. After gaining attention by giving addresses on the value of commercial relations with England, and of colonization as a way of renewing the nation, he became Foreign Minister in July 1797. He was behind the demand for bribes in the XYZ Affair which escalated into the Quasi-War, an undeclared naval war with the United States, 1798–1800.  Talleyrand saw a possible political career for Napoleon during the Italian campaigns of 1796 to 1797. He wrote many letters to Napoleon, and the two became close allies. Talleyrand was against the destruction of the Republic of Venice, but he complimented Napoleon when the Treaty of Campo Formio with Austria was concluded (Venice was given to Austria), probably because he wanted to reinforce his alliance with Napoleon. Later in 1797, Talleyrand was instrumental in assisting with the Coup of 18 Fructidor, which ousted two moderate members of the Directory in favour of the Jacobins headed by Paul Barras.

Under Napoleon
Talleyrand, along with Napoleon's younger brother, Lucien Bonaparte, was instrumental in the 1799 coup d'état of 18 Brumaire, establishing the French Consulate government, although he also made preparations for flight if necessary. He also persuaded Barras to resign as Director. Talleyrand was soon made Foreign Minister by Napoleon, although he rarely agreed with Napoleon's foreign policy. Domestically, Talleyrand used his influence to help in the repeal of the strict laws against émigrés, refractory clergy, and the royalists of the west. The Pope released him from the ban of excommunication in the Concordat of 1801, which also revoked the Civil Constitution of the Clergy. Talleyrand was instrumental in the completion of the Treaty of Amiens in 1802. He wanted Napoleon to keep peace afterwards, as he thought France had reached its maximum expansion.

Talleyrand was an integral player in the German mediatization. While the Treaty of Campo Formio of 1797 had, on paper, stripped German princes of their lands beyond the left bank of the Rhine, it was not enforced until the Treaty of Lunéville in 1801. As the French annexed these lands, leaders believed that rulers of states such as Baden, Bavaria, Württemberg, Prussia, Hesse and Nassau, who lost territories on the Left Bank, should receive new territories on the Right Bank through the secularization of ecclesiastical principalities. Many of these rulers gave out bribes in order to secure new lands, and Talleyrand and some of his associates amassed about 10 million francs in the process. This was the first blow in the destruction of the Holy Roman Empire.

While helping to establish French supremacy in neighbouring states and assisting Bonaparte in securing the title of Premier Consul for life, Talleyrand sought all means of securing the permanent welfare of France. He worked hard to prevent the rupture of the peace of Amiens which occurred in May 1803, and he did what he could to prevent the Louisiana Purchase earlier in the year. These events, as he saw, told against the best interests of France and endangered the gains which she had secured by war and diplomacy. Thereafter he strove to moderate Napoleon's ambition and to preserve the European system as far as possible.

Napoleon forced Talleyrand into marriage in September 1802 to longtime mistress Catherine Grand (née Worlée). Talleyrand purchased the Château de Valençay in May 1803, upon the urging of Napoleon. This later was used as the site of imprisonment of the Spanish Royalty in 1808–1813, after Napoleon's invasion of Spain.

In May 1804, Napoleon bestowed upon Talleyrand the title of Grand Chamberlain of the Empire, with almost 500,000 francs a year. In 1806, he was made Sovereign Prince of Benevento (or Bénévent), a former papal fief in southern Italy. Talleyrand held the title until 1815 and administered the principality concurrently with his other tasks.

Talleyrand was opposed to the harsh treatment of Austria in the 1805 Treaty of Pressburg and of Prussia in the Peace of Tilsit in 1807. In 1806, after Pressburg, he profited greatly from the reorganization of the German lands, this time into the Confederation of the Rhine. He negotiated the Treaty of Posen with Saxony, but was shut out completely from the negotiations at Tilsit.  After Queen Louise of Prussia failed in her appeal to Napoleon to spare her nation, she wept and was consoled by Talleyrand. This gave him a good name among the elites of European nations outside France.

Changing sides
Having wearied of serving a master in whom he no longer had much confidence, Talleyrand resigned as minister of foreign affairs in 1807, although the Emperor retained him in the Council of State as Vice-Grand Elector of the Empire. He disapproved of Napoleon's Spanish initiative, which resulted in the Peninsular War beginning in 1808. At the Congress of Erfurt in September–October 1808, Talleyrand secretly counseled Tsar Alexander. The Tsar's attitude towards Napoleon was one of apprehensive opposition.  Talleyrand repaired the confidence of the Russian monarch, who rebuked Napoleon's attempts to form a direct anti-Austrian military alliance.  Napoleon had expected Talleyrand to help convince the Tsar to accept his proposals and never discovered that Talleyrand was working at cross-purposes.  Talleyrand believed Napoleon would eventually destroy the empire he had worked to build across multiple rulers.

After his resignation in 1807 from the ministry, Talleyrand began to accept bribes from hostile powers (mainly Austria, but also Russia), to betray Napoleon's secrets. Talleyrand and Joseph Fouché, who were typically enemies in both politics and the salons, had a rapprochement in late 1808 and entered into discussions over the imperial line of succession.  Napoleon had yet to address this matter and the two men knew that without a legitimate heir a struggle for power would erupt in the wake of Napoleon's death.  Even Talleyrand, who believed that Napoleon's policies were leading France to ruin, understood the necessity of peaceful transitions of power.  Napoleon received word of their actions and deemed them treasonous.  This perception caused the famous dressing down of Talleyrand in front of Napoleon's marshals, during which Napoleon famously claimed that he could "break him like a glass, but it's not worth the trouble" and added with a scatological tone that Talleyrand was "shit in a silk stocking", to which the minister coldly retorted, once Napoleon had left, "Pity that so great a man should have been so badly brought up!"

Talleyrand opposed the further harsh treatment of Austria in 1809 after the War of the Fifth Coalition.  He was also a critic of the French invasion of Russia in 1812.  He was invited to resume his former office in late 1813, but Talleyrand could see that power was slipping from Napoleon's hands. He offered to resign from the council in early 1814, but Napoleon refused the move. Talleyrand then hosted the tsar at the end of March after the fall of Paris, persuaded him that the best chance of stability lay with the House of Bourbon, and gained his support. On 1 April 1814 he led the French Senate in establishing a provisional government in Paris, of which he was elected president.  On 2 April the Senate officially deposed Napoleon with the Acte de déchéance de l'Empereur; by 11 April it had approved the Treaty of Fontainebleau and adopted a new constitution to re-establish the Bourbon monarchy.

Bourbon Restoration and July Monarchy

When Napoleon was succeeded by Louis XVIII in April 1814, Talleyrand was one of the key agents of the restoration of the House of Bourbon, although he opposed the new legislation of Louis' rule. Talleyrand was the chief French negotiator at the Congress of Vienna, and earlier that same year he signed the Treaty of Paris. It was due in part to his skills that the terms of the treaty were remarkably lenient towards France. As the Congress opened, the right to make decisions was restricted to four countries: Austria, the United Kingdom, Prussia, and Russia. France and other European countries were invited to attend, but were not allowed to influence the process. Talleyrand promptly became the champion of the small countries and demanded admission into the ranks of the decision-making process. The four powers admitted France and Spain to the decision-making backrooms of the conference after a good deal of diplomatic maneuvering by Talleyrand, who had the support of the Spanish representative, Pedro Gómez Labrador, Marquis of Labrador. Spain was excluded after a while (a result of both the Marquis of Labrador's incompetence as well as the quixotic nature of Spain's agenda), but France (Talleyrand) was allowed to participate until the end. Russia and Prussia sought to enlarge their territory at the Congress. Russia demanded annexation of Poland (already occupied by Russian troops), and this demand was finally satisfied, despite protests by France, Austria and the United Kingdom. Austria was afraid of future conflicts with Russia or Prussia and the United Kingdom was opposed to their expansion as well—and Talleyrand managed to take advantage of these contradictions within the former anti-French coalition. On 3 January 1815, a secret treaty was signed by France's Talleyrand, Austria's Metternich and Britain's Castlereagh. By this tract, officially a secret treaty of defensive alliance, the three powers agreed to use force if necessary to "repulse aggression" (of Russia and Prussia) and to protect the "state of security and independence."

Talleyrand, having managed to establish a middle position, received some favours from the other countries in exchange for his support: France returned to its 1792 boundaries without reparations, with French control over papal Avignon, Montbéliard (Mompelgard) and Salm, which had been independent at the start of the French Revolution in 1789. It would later be debated which outcome would have been better for France: allowing Prussia to annex all of Saxony (Talleyrand ensured that only part of the kingdom would be annexed) or the Rhine provinces. The first option would have kept Prussia farther away from France, but would have needed much more opposition as well. Some historians have argued that Talleyrand's diplomacy wound up establishing the faultlines of World War I, especially as it allowed Prussia to engulf small German states west of the Rhine. This simultaneously placed Prussian armed forces at the French-German frontier, for the first time; made Prussia the largest German power in terms of territory, population and the industry of the Ruhr and Rhineland; and eventually helped pave the way to German unification under the Prussian throne. However, at the time Talleyrand's diplomacy was regarded as successful, as it removed the threat of France being partitioned by the victors. Talleyrand also managed to strengthen his own position in France (ultraroyalists had disapproved of the presence of a former "revolutionary" and "murderer of the Duke d'Enghien" in the royal cabinet).

Napoleon's return to France in 1815 and his subsequent defeat, the Hundred Days, was a reverse for the diplomatic victories of Talleyrand (who remained in Vienna the whole time). The second peace settlement was markedly less lenient and it was fortunate for France that the business of the Congress had been concluded. Having been appointed foreign minister and president of the council on 9 July 1815, Talleyrand resigned in September of that year, over his objections to the second treaty. Louis XVIII appointed him as the Grand Chamberlain of France, a mostly ceremonial role which provided Talleyrand with a steady income. For the next fifteen years he restricted himself to the role of "elder statesman", criticising and intriguing against Minister of Police Élie, duc Decazes, Prime Minister Duc de Richelieu and other political opponents from the sidelines. In celebration of the birth of Duc de Bordeaux, Louis XVIII made Talleyrand a knight of the Order of the Holy Spirit.

In December 1829, Talleyrand funded the foundation of the National newspaper. The newspaper was run by his personal friend Adolphe Thiers, alongside Armand Carrel, François Mignet and Stendhal, its first issue appeared on 3 January 1830. It quickly became the mouthpiece of the Orléanist cause, gaining popularity among the French liberal bourgeoisie. Following the ascent of King Louis-Philippe to the throne in the aftermath of the July Revolution of 1830, Talleyrand reluctantly agreed to become ambassador to the United Kingdom, a post he held from 1830 to 1834. In this role, he strove to reinforce the legitimacy of Louis-Philippe's regime. He played a vital role in the London Conference of 1830, rebuking a partition plan developed by his son Charles de Flahaut and helping bring Leopold Saxe-Coburg to the throne of the newly independent Kingdom of Belgium. In April 1834 he crowned his diplomatic career by signing the treaty which brought together as allies France, Great Britain, Spain and Portugal.

After resigning from his position as ambassador in London in November 1834, Talleyrand stopped playing an active role in French politics. He split his time between Château de Valençay and Saint-Florentin, where he hosted frequent banquets and played whist with his visitors. His physical health began to steadily deteriorate and he began using an armchair on wheels provided to him by Louis Philippe I. He spent most of his time in the company of the Duchess Dino and concerned himself with the education of her daughter Pauline. Talleyrand suffered from bouts of recurring depression which were caused by his concern over his legacy and the development of the Napoleonic myth. To that end he ordered that his autobiography, the Memoirs, be published 30 years after his death. He also sought to gain the friendship of people he believed would shape public opinion in the future, including Honoré de Balzac, Lady Granville and Alphonse de Lamartine. During the last years of his life Talleyrand began planning his reconciliation with the Catholic Church. On 16 May 1838, he signed a retraction of his errors towards the church and a letter of submission to Pope Gregory XVI. He died the following day at 3:55 p.m., at Saint-Florentin.

By a codicil added to his will on 17 March 1838, Talleyrand left his memoirs and papers to the duchess of Dino and Adolphe de Bacourt. The latter revised them with care, and added to them other pieces emanating from Talleyrand. They fell into some question: first that Talleyrand is known to have destroyed many of his most important papers, and secondly that de Bacourt almost certainly drew up the connected narrative which we now possess from notes which were in more or less of confusion. The  were later edited by the duc de Broglie and published in 1891.

Private life 

Talleyrand had a reputation as a voluptuary and a womaniser. He left no legitimate children, though he possibly fathered over two dozen illegitimate ones. Four possible children of his have been identified: Charles Joseph, comte de Flahaut, generally accepted to be an illegitimate son of Talleyrand;  the painter Eugène Delacroix, once rumoured to be Talleyrand's son, though this is doubted by historians who have examined the issue (for example, Léon Noël, French ambassador); the "Mysterious Charlotte", possibly his daughter by his future wife, Catherine Worlée Grand; and Pauline, ostensibly the daughter of the Duke and Duchess Dino. Of these four, only the first is given credence by historians. However, the French historian Emmanuel de Waresquiel has lately given much credibility to father-daughter link between Talleyrand and Pauline whom he referred to as "my dear Minette". Thaddeus Stevens "suffered too from the rumor that he was actually the bastard son of Count Talleyrand, who was said to have visited New England in the year before Stevens' birth.... Actually Talleyrand did not visit New England till 1794, when Stevens was already two years old."

Aristocratic women were a key component of Talleyrand's political tactics, both for their influence and their ability to cross borders unhindered. His presumed lover Germaine de Staël was a major influence on him, and he on her. Though their personal philosophies were most different (she a romantic, he very much unsentimental), she assisted him greatly, most notably by lobbying Barras to permit Talleyrand to return to France from his American exile, and then to have him made foreign minister. He lived with Catherine Worlée, born in India and married there to Charles Grand. She had traveled about before settling in Paris in the 1780s, where she lived as a notorious courtesan for several years before divorcing Grand to marry Talleyrand. Talleyrand was in no hurry to marry, and it was after repeated postponements that Napoleon obliged him in 1802 to formalize the relationship or risk his political career. While serving as a high level negotiator at the Congress of Vienna (1814–1815), Talleyrand entered into an arrangement with Dorothea von Biron, the wife of his nephew, the Duke of Dino. Shortly after, he separated from Catherine.

Talleyrand's venality was notorious; in the tradition of the ancien régime, he expected to be paid for the state duties he performed—whether these can properly be called "bribes" is open to debate. For example, during the German Mediatisation, the consolidation of the small German states, a number of German rulers and elites paid him to save their possessions or enlarge their territories. Less successfully, he solicited payments from the United States government to open negotiations, precipitating a diplomatic disaster (the "XYZ Affair"). The difference between his diplomatic success in Europe and failure with the United States illustrates that his diplomacy rested firmly on the power of the French army that was a terrible threat to the German states within reach, but lacked the logistics to threaten the USA not the least because of the Royal Navy domination of the seas. After Napoleon's defeat, he withdrew claims to the title "Prince of Benevento", but was created Duke of Talleyrand with the style "Prince de Talleyrand" for life, in the same manner as his estranged wife.

Described by biographer Philip Ziegler as a "pattern of subtlety and finesse" and a "creature of grandeur and guile", Talleyrand was a great conversationalist, gourmet, and wine connoisseur. He was a frequent visitor at the salon hosted by Adèle de Bellegarde and her sister Aurore, with whom he dined regularly over a period of five years. From 1801 to 1804, he owned Château Haut-Brion in Bordeaux. In 1803, Napoleon ordered Talleyrand to acquire the Château de Valençay as a place particularly appropriate for reception of foreign dignitaries, and Talleyrand made it his primary place of residence until his death in 1838. There he employed the renowned French chef Marie-Antoine Carême, one of the first celebrity chefs known as the "chef of kings and king of chefs", and was said to have spent an hour every day with him. His Paris residence on the Place de la Concorde, acquired in 1812 and sold to James Mayer de Rothschild in 1838, is now owned by the Embassy of the United States.

Talleyrand has been regarded as a traitor because of his support for successive regimes, some of which were mutually hostile. According to French philosopher Simone Weil, criticism of his loyalty is unfounded, as Talleyrand served not every regime as had been said, but in reality "France behind every regime".

Near the end of his life, Talleyrand became interested in Catholicism again while teaching his young granddaughter simple prayers. The Abbé Félix Dupanloup came to Talleyrand in his last hours, and according to his account Talleyrand made confession and received extreme unction. When the abbé tried to anoint Talleyrand's palms, as prescribed by the rite, he turned his hands over to make the priest anoint him on the back of the hands, since he was a bishop. He died on 17 May 1838 and was buried in Notre-Dame Chapel, near his Castle of Valençay.

Today, when speaking of the art of diplomacy, the phrase "he is a Talleyrand" is variously used to describe a statesman of great resourcefulness and craft, or a cynical and consciousless self-serving politician.

Honours 

 Pair de France.
 Knight Grand Cross in the Legion of Honour
 Knight of the Order of the Holy Spirit
 Knight of the Order of the Golden Fleece of Spain
 Knight Grand Cross of the Order of St. Stephen of Hungary.
 Knight Grand Cross of the Order of Saint Andrew.
 Knight Grand Cross of the Order of the Red Eagle.
 Knight Grand Cross of the Order of the Black Eagle.
 Knight of the Order of the Elephant.
 Knight of the Order of Saint Hubert.
 Knight Grand Cross of the Order of the Sun.
 Knight Grand Cross of the Order of the Crown of Saxony.
Member of the American Philosophical Society (elected 1796).

Anecdotes 
 In 1797 a rumor spread that the King of Great Britain had died. A banker, hoping to make a profit from inside information, appeared at Talleyrand's door seeking information. Talleyrand replied along the lines of, "But of course. I shall be delighted, if the information I have to give be of any use to you." The banker listened with bated breath as Talleyrand continued: "Some say the King of England is dead; others, that he is not dead: for my own part, I believe neither the one nor the other. I tell you this in confidence, but I rely on your discretion."
 The Spanish Ambassador complained to Talleyrand that the seals on his diplomatic letters had been broken. Talleyrand replied, "I shall wager I can guess how the thing happened. I am convinced your despatch was opened by some one who desired to know what was inside."
 Germaine de Staël's novel Delphine allegedly depicted Talleyrand as an old woman, and herself as the heroine. Upon meeting Madame de Staël, Talleyrand remarked, "They tell me that we are both of us in your novel, in the disguise of women."
 Talleyrand had a morbid dread of falling out of bed in his sleep.  To prevent this, he had his mattresses made with a depression in the centre.  As a further safety measure, he wore fourteen cotton nightcaps at once, held together by 'a sort of tiara'.
 Following the arrival of the Allies, Talleyrand's mansion hosted Tsar Alexander. Later, his bedroom became the center of government in the provisional government. It was actually quite common to hold important occurrences in one's bedroom as it was warm for the host while the attendants had to stand in the cold night air.
 On hearing of the death of a Turkish ambassador, Talleyrand is supposed to have said: "I wonder what he meant by that?" More commonly, the quote is attributed to Metternich, the Austrian diplomat, upon Talleyrand's death in 1838.
 During the occupation of Paris by the Allies, Prussian General Blücher wanted to destroy the Pont d'Iéna, which was named after a French victorious battle against Prussia. The Prefect of Paris tried everything to change the mind of Blücher, without success, and finally went to Talleyrand asking him whether he could write a letter to the General asking him not to destroy the bridge. Talleyrand instead wrote to Tsar Alexander, who was in person in Paris, asking him to grant to the people of Paris the favour of inaugurating himself the bridge under a new name (Pont de l'École militaire). The Tsar accepted, and Blücher could not then destroy a bridge inaugurated by an Ally. The name of the bridge was reverted to its original name under Louis-Philippe.
 The district of East Levenshulme in Manchester is called Talleyrand. There is a local tradition that he stayed there, presumably during 1792–94.

Gallery

Notes

Further reading

Biographies 
 ; a major scholarly biography
 Brinton, Crane.  Lives of Talleyrand (1936), 300 pp scholarly study online
 
 Kurtz, Harold. (1958) "Talleyrand (part I)" History Today (Nov 1958) 8#11 pp 741–750. and Part II, (Dec 1958) 8#12 pp  847–871. 
 , popular biography online review
 Madelin, Louis. Talleyrand (1948), a scholarly biography. online
 Orieux, Jean. Talleyrand: The Art of Survival (1974) 677pp; scholarly biography
 Pflaum, Rosalynd. Talleyrand and His World (2010) 478pp, popular biography

Scholarly studies 
 Blinn, Harold E. "New Light on Talleyrand at the Congress of Vienna." Pacific Historical Review 4#2 1935, pp. 143–160. online
 Earl, John L. "Talleyrand in Philadelphia, 1794–1796." Pennsylvania Magazine of History and Biography 91#3, 1967, pp. 282–298. online
 Ferraro, Guglielmo. The Reconstruction of Europe: Talleyrand and the Congress of Vienna, 1814–1815 (1941) online
 Greenbaum, Louis S. "Talleyrand and Vergennes: The Debut of a Diplomat." Catholic Historical Review 56#3 1970, pp. 543–550. online
 Greenbaum, Louis S. "Talleyrand as Agent-General of the Clergy of France: A Study in Comparative Influence." Catholic Historical Review 48.4 (1963): 473–486. online
 
 Neave, G. "Monsieur de Talleyrand-Périgord's Qualities" Higher Education Policy 19, 401–409 (2006). online
 Norman, Barbara. Napoleon and Talleyrand: The last two weeks (1976) online
 Ross, Steven T. European Diplomatic History, 1789–1815: France Against Europe (1969)
 Sked, Alan. "Talleyrand and England, 1792–1838: A Reinterpretation," Diplomacy & Statecraft (2006) 17#4 pp. 647–64.
 Stinchcombe, William. "Talleyrand and the American Negotiations of 1797–1798." Journal of American History 62#3 1975, pp. 575–590. online
 Swain, J. E. "Talleyrand's Last Diplomatic Encounter." The Historian 1#1 1938, pp. 33–53. online, ambassador to Britain

Historiography 
Moncure, James A. ed. Research Guide to European Historical Biography: 1450–Present (4 vol 1992); 4:1823–33

Primary sources
 Memoirs of the Prince de Talleyrand ed by Albert de Broglie. (1891) online
Dilke, Charles Wentworth. "The Talleyrand Memoirs." The North American Review, vol. 152, no. 411, 1891, pp. 157–174. online
 Talleyrand, Prince. The Correspondence of Prince Talleyrand and King Louis XVIII during the Congress of Vienna (Kessinger Publishing, 2005).

Non-English language

External links 

Charles Maurice de Talleyrand-Périgord 1754–1838
Career of Mme Grand, Talleyrand's wife
Bishop Charles Maurice de Talleyrand-Périgord, Catholic Hierarchy website
Talleyrands letters and dispatches translated into English
 Painting of Charles Maurice de Talleyrand-Périgord by Baron Gérard at the Metropolitan Museum of Art
 
 

|-

|-

|-

|-

|-

|-

|-

|-

|-

|-

|-

|-

|-

1754 births
1838 deaths
Charles-Maurice
Ambassadors of France to the United Kingdom
Bishops of Autun
French Foreign Ministers
French people of the Napoleonic Wars
French Roman Catholics
Laicized Roman Catholic bishops
Lycée Saint-Louis alumni
Members of the Sénat conservateur
Ministers of Marine and the Colonies
People of the Belgian Revolution
People of the Bourbon Restoration
People of the French Revolution
People of the Quasi-War
Politicians from Paris
Prime Ministers of France
Princes of Bénévent
People temporarily excommunicated by the Catholic Church
18th-century French diplomats
19th-century French diplomats
 1
Knights of the Golden Fleece of Spain
Grand Crosses of the Order of Saint Stephen of Hungary
T